DXKB (89.3 FM), broadcasting as Magic 89.3, is a radio station owned and operated by Quest Broadcasting Inc. and the partner station of Tiger 22 Media. Its studio and transmitter are located at the 10th Floor, One Providence Bldg., Lifestyle District, Corrales Ext., Cagayan de Oro. This station broadcasts daily from 6am to 10pm.

The station was formerly known as Killerbee 89.3 from its inception in 1994 until March 27, 2013. This station, along with the other Killerbee stations, were relaunched under the Magic moniker (adopted from its parent station) by April 29, 2013.

References

Contemporary hit radio stations in the Philippines
Radio stations in Cagayan de Oro
Radio stations established in 1994
Quest Broadcasting